The Wiltshire and Swindon History Centre in Chippenham, Wiltshire, England, serves as a focal point for heritage services relating to Wiltshire and Swindon. The centre opened in 2007 and is funded by Wiltshire Council and Swindon Borough Council. It has purpose-built archive storage and research facilities and incorporates the local studies library, museums service, archaeology service, Wiltshire buildings record and the conservation service.

History
Existing accommodation for the Wiltshire and Swindon Record Office, in a former mattress factory in Trowbridge, had been declared sub-standard by the Royal Commission on Historical Manuscripts in 1998. Wiltshire County Council and Swindon Borough Council took the opportunity not only to build a new record repository which would meet the British Standard for Archive Repositories (BS5454), but also to create a centre for Wiltshire and Swindon history. The centre preserves the collections of the Wiltshire and Swindon Archives Service, County Local Studies Library, Wiltshire Archaeological Service, Wiltshire Conservation and Museum Services and the Wiltshire Buildings Record. These services were previously at Trowbridge and Salisbury.

The previous poor accommodation for the services had disadvantaged users and restricted use of services.  The new facility was designed to substantially improve access, both for visitors to the centre and those using services at a distance. An education room has been included for use by schools and colleges and for training as well as a workshop to produce displays.

After two unsuccessful bids to the Heritage Lottery Fund, Wiltshire County Council and Swindon Borough Council decided in spring 2004 to bear the whole cost themselves. In March 2005, Cowlins of Bristol were selected as the Design and Build contractors. This was announced at the WCC Cabinet on 18 March; that meeting also confirmed that the name of the new facility was to be "The Wiltshire and Swindon History Centre". Cowlins started work on 28 June and the roof was topped out on 6 December 2005. The building is a concrete and glass construction, covering 4,000 square metres on two floors (approximately the same area as five football pitches). It conforms to BS 5454 and has been praised as a "state of the art" building by Nicholas Kingsley, Head of the National Advisory Service, The National Archives. The building was completed in October 2006 and handed over to both councils on 29 January 2007. After eighteen months of planning, each service moved from their former site to the new centre in Chippenham between February and October 2007. In the case of the archive service, this involved moving over 30,000 boxes of archival material.

Archaeology service
The Wiltshire Archaeological Service was established in 1975 with the appointment of a County Archaeologist.  It was based in Chapman's Building, Trowbridge.  Initially, the role of the Service was to carry out excavations on development sites in Wiltshire.  In the late 1970s it became apparent that there was demand for information on archaeology in the form of enquiries from planners, highways engineers and developers and a decision was made to establish the Sites and Monuments Record (SMR).  Complete coverage of the county was achieved in 1981.  The recording and giving of advice is currently the primary role of the Service and excavations are now principally carried out by other agencies.  As discoveries occur the record has grown at about 5% per annum.  Advice has been supplied to County and District Planning Officers since 1980, and in 1984 links were formed with the Ministry of Defence as a result of its substantial holdings in Wiltshire.  The service has benefited substantially from English Heritage grant aid, particularly in developing databases for the Avebury and Stonehenge World Heritage Sites.

Archive service
The Wiltshire and Swindon Archives Service cares for and gives access to the archival heritage of the county and borough.  It was established in 1947 and now holds over seven miles of archives, representing over 3,000 organisations and millions of individuals and their history, stretching back to Norman times.  Initially based in County Hall, it transferred to Chapman's Building, Bythesea Road, Trowbridge, in the 1970s. That building was confirmed sub-standard by the Royal Commission on Historical Manuscripts in 1998. The service was called the Wiltshire Record Office until 1997 and thereafter the Wiltshire and Swindon Record Office, but in 2006 the broader title of Wiltshire and Swindon Archives was adopted.  The aim of the Archives Service is to collect, preserve and give access to the historic archives of the County and Borough.

The archives of the Wiltshire and Swindon Archives Service fall into three categories: official, ecclesiastical and private. Over 3,000 organisations are represented in the archive.  For an area that until comparatively recently had a small and largely agricultural population, the quantity of surviving records (over 850 cubic metres) is impressive.

There are five groups of archives in the Wiltshire and Swindon Archives Service that are of pre-eminent, regional or national importance: the political papers of Walter Long MP, 1854–1924; the British Rail Western Region, (formerly Great Western Railway), archives which are still growing; the archives of the West Wiltshire firms of cloth manufacturers; the Diocesan probate collection (also known as the Wiltshire Wills collection); and a collection of archive films and videos.

Wiltshire Buildings Record
The Wiltshire Buildings Record was set up in 1979 to fill a perceived gap, not provided for by any other Wiltshire organisations, in recording threatened buildings within the county.  The Wiltshire Buildings Record has ties with other specialised bodies, including representatives from archaeology, museums, local history, archives, planning and architecture.  Much of the record consists of photographic items that merit controlled storage.  It was previously based in Chapman's Building which had no such facilities.  It keeps the record of statutory listed buildings within the county and provides access to the listing.

Wiltshire Buildings Record has created a database of more than 13,000 sites throughout the county, thus preserving information on buildings which have since been lost, and helping to protect those which have come under threat. It creates and maintains an index of dateable building features and building types, which provides information for architectural research.  It has a collection of 118 items from buildings within the county, to ensure their preservation for future study and comparison.

Conservation service
The Wiltshire County Council Object Conservation Service was based at Wyndham House in Salisbury from 1980 to 2007, and the Archive Conservation Service was formerly in Chapman's building, Trowbridge.  The service was set up to provide conservation services to museums in Wiltshire as none of the museums had in-house conservation provision, also to ensure the preservation of the County Archive.  It works closely with the Museums Advisory Service.  Conservation services are presently supplied to 18 museums in Wiltshire registered under the Museum Accreditation Scheme operated by the Museums, Libraries and Archives Council.  The service provides specialist advice on all aspects of collections care, remedial conservation and training courses.

The service to Wiltshire museums is funded principally by Wiltshire Council.  Income is generated by selling conservation expertise to a wide range of heritage organisations including Swindon Borough Council and other services throughout the UK.  The work programme is set annually in liaison with Wiltshire museums and other heritage organisations.  The South West Museums Council assisted with the establishment of this service and very close liaison and project grant funding continues with its successor body, Museums, Libraries and Archives South West. The aim of the Conservation Service is to enable Wiltshire museums to ensure the long term preservation of their collections and to ensure the preservation of the county archives.

Local Studies Library – Wiltshire Studies
The Wiltshire County Council County Local Studies Library was formerly part of the Library Service and was based in Chapman's Building, Trowbridge.  In 2007 the Local Studies Library was transferred to Heritage Services.  It is a major resource for the study of Wiltshire's heritage. The service provides advice to local history societies, research groups and individuals on both research and publication.  The service acquires and gives access to the County Historic Photograph Collection, in liaison with the Wiltshire Museum Service.

The aim of the Service is to acquire, preserve and give access to publications related to Wiltshire. The collection of published Wiltshire material includes 18,000 monographs, 2,600 reels of microfilm including newspapers dating from 1736, 35,000 microfiches, over 40,000 photographs and 11,000 journals.  The library collects, preserves and makes available for research all Wiltshire publications, including videos, CDs, tapes and CD-ROMS.  Material on adjacent counties and extensive collections on archaeology, museology, family history, architecture and history are used by heritage officers as well as being used by the public.

Victoria County History
The Wiltshire Victoria County History has its offices at the History Centre. It is part of the national Victoria County History project.

Museums service
Wiltshire Council does not directly run any museums, instead it takes an enabling approach through the County Museums Advisory Service. The service was established following the 1974 local government re-organisation. It was based in Chapman's Building, Trowbridge. Support is focused on museums, which have, or are applying for, acceptance under the Museum Accreditation Scheme. It works closely with the Conservation Service. Following a review of the service in 1996/7, the key areas of service delivery are:
Provide a county wide publicity and promotion facility for museums
Act as professional curatorial advisers to ten small independent volunteer-run museums
Provide learning, development and training opportunities for museum staff and volunteers
Advise on documentation and cataloguing standards
Provide a central repository for museum data
Provision of grant aid to supported museums
Help museums meet and maintain Museum Accreditation Scheme standards
Help museums design displays
Help museums realise the learning potential of their collections
Co-ordinate county wide projects such as volunteer recruitment
Host the Wiltshire Treasures public online catalogue

Access to services
Wiltshire and Swindon History Centre is open to the public. Appointments are not compulsory but the staff can be informed in advance of a visit to make the most of the time available for research. The centre operates a computerised user registration system, so a form of identification including name and address is required. The centre is fully accessible to visitors with disabilities. The public areas are on ground level. Disabled parking and toilet facilities are provided. The centre is equipped with a hearing loop.

See also
Wiltshire Record Society
List of museums in Wiltshire
History of Wiltshire
 Category:History of Wiltshire

External links

Wiltshire Community History
Wiltshire and Swindon History Centre at the National Archives

Archives in Wiltshire
Culture in Wiltshire
History of Wiltshire
Organisations based in Wiltshire
County record offices in England
Libraries in Wiltshire